The 1964 United Nations Security Council election was held on 29 and 30 December during the nineteenth session of the United Nations General Assembly, held at United Nations Headquarters in New York City. The General Assembly elected four members through consultation of the president, as non-permanent members of the UN Security Council for two-year mandates commencing on 1 January 1965.

Rules 
The Security Council has 15 seats, filled by five permanent members and ten non-permanent members. Each year, half of the non-permanent members are elected for two-year terms. A sitting member may not immediately run for re-election.

Result 
At this time, the United Nations had 115 member states (for a timeline of UN membership, see Enlargement of the United Nations). There were five candidacies for four seats. At the meeting on 29 December 1964, the President of the United Nations General Assembly proposed granting seats to Uruguay, Malaysia, and the Netherlands, a motion that was approved by the assembly. Further discussion of the candidacies of Mali and Jordan was moved to another day. 

At another meeting on 30 December 1964, it was agreed that Jordan would occupy the seat for the first year, and Mali for the second.

See also 

 List of members of the United Nations Security Council
 Brazil and the United Nations
 Canada and the United Nations
 India and the United Nations

References

Notes

Sources

External links 

 UN Document A/59/881 Note Verbale from the Permanent Mission of Costa Rica containing a record of Security Council elections up to 2004

1964 elections
1964
Non-partisan elections
1964 in international relations
Security Council election